Wales Netball, formally registered as the Wales Netball Association, is the national governing body for netball in Wales and was founded in 1945. Wales Netball is responsible for national championships, Wales national netball team selection, international matches, the training and development of players, coaches and umpires and for the Sport Wales National Centre Netball Academy, Cardiff.

Wales Netball was a founder member of the International Federation of Netball Associations (IFNA)—which governs world netball—in 1960. Netball is played in over fifty countries. Wales' current IFNA world ranking is eighth (last updated 17 May 2015).

International competitions in which Wales compete include the European Championships, the Commonwealth Games and the Netball World Championships. Wales were European Champions in 2001. The World Youth Netball Championship was held in Cardiff in July 2000.

Wales Netball is based in the Sport Wales National Centre, Sophia Gardens, Cardiff.

References

Netball in Wales
Netball governing bodies in Europe
Netball
Organisations based in Cardiff
1945 establishments in Wales
Sports organizations established in 1945
Wal